Denys Stepanovych Pidhurskyi (born 27 May 2003) is a Ukrainian professional footballer who plays as a midfielder for Rukh Lviv.

Career
Born in Seredkevychi, Yavoriv Raion, Lviv Oblast, Pidhurskyi is a product of the Rava Rava-Ruska and FC Karpaty Lviv youth systems.

In July 2021 he transferred RukhLviv.

References

External links
 
 

2003 births
Living people
Sportspeople from Lviv Oblast
Ukrainian footballers
Ukraine youth international footballers
Association football midfielders
FC Karpaty Lviv players
FC Rukh Lviv players
Ukrainian Premier League players
Ukrainian Second League players